Orisha is an elemental spirit of the Yoruba religion.

Orisha or Orisa may also refer to:

 Orishas (band), a Cuban hip-hop/Latino fusion band
 Orishas (comics), a pantheon of elemental Yoruba deities published by DC Comics
 Odisha, a state located on the eastern coast of India
 Orisa (Overwatch), a character from the 2016 video game